The Substitute: Original Motion Picture Soundtrack is the original soundtrack to Robert Mandel's 1996 crime film The Substitute. It was released on April 9, 1996 via Priority Records and consisted entirely of hip hop music. The album peaked at #90 on the Billboard 200 chart and #18 on the Top R&B/Hip-Hop Albums chart.

Track listing

References

External links

1996 soundtrack albums
Hip hop soundtracks
Gangsta rap soundtracks
Priority Records soundtracks
Albums produced by Prodeje
Albums produced by Fredwreck
Albums produced by Rhythum D
Albums produced by Courtney Branch
Action film soundtracks
Thriller film soundtracks